Mississippi: The Album is the second studio album by American rapper and record producer David Banner. It was released on May 20, 2003, by SRC Records and Universal Records, serving as his major-label debut studio release with SRC and Universal. The album spawned the popular club track "Like a Pimp" featuring Lil Flip, and the single "Cadillac on 22s".

Track listing

Charts

Weekly charts

Year-end charts

References

2003 albums
Albums produced by David Banner
David Banner albums
Universal Records albums